Mesonoemacheilus is a genus of stone loach endemic to India.

Species
There are currently eight recognized species in this genus:
 Mesonoemacheilus guentheri (F. Day, 1867)
 Mesonoemacheilus herrei Nalbant & Bănărescu, 1982
 Mesonoemacheilus menoni (Zacharias & Minimol, 1999) (species inquirenda)
 Mesonoemacheilus pambarensis (Rema Devi & Indra, 1994)
 Mesonoemacheilus petrubanarescui (Menon, 1984)
 Mesonoemacheilus pulchellus (F. Day, 1873)
 Mesonoemacheilus remadevii Shaji, 2002 
 Mesonoemacheilus triangularis (F. Day, 1865)
 Mesonoemacheilus tambaraparniensis

References

Nemacheilidae
Fish of Asia
Fish of India
Taxa named by Petre Mihai Bănărescu
Taxa named by Teodor T. Nalbant